Engin Altay (born 15 December 1963) is a Turkish politician from the Republican People's Party (CHP) who serves as a Member of Parliament for the electoral district of Sinop since the 2002. He was re-elected in 2007, 2011, June 2015 and November 2015. On 30 June 2011, Altay was elected as one of the three CHP parliamentary group leaders, serving alongside Muharrem İnce, Akif Hamzaçebi and later Levent Gök.

Early life and career
Born and raised in Sinop, Altay was educated at Dokuz Eylül University and became a teacher in various districts in the provinces of Sinop and Sivas. He briefly served as deputy mayor for the town of Erfelek for a year before resigning in order to contest the 2002 general election. He won a seat in his hometown of Sinop. In parliament, he was a member of the Human Rights Commission as well as the Education, Youth, Culture and Sport committees. He led the Turkey-Mongolia partnership commission for four years.

Having served as a member of the CHP party council and central executive committee, Altay was elected parliamentary group leader in 2013 after his predecessor Emine Ülker Tarhan stood down. He has been at the forefront of efforts to bring AKP government ministers accused of corruption to court and received both praise and criticism for throwing a copy of the parliamentary by-laws at speaker Cemil Çiçek during the swearing in ceremony of Recep Tayyip Erdoğan.

He is married with one child and can speak English at a semi-fluent level.

See also
Muharrem İnce
Sinop (electoral district)

References

External links
MP profile at the Parliament website
Collection of all relevant news items at Haberler.com

Contemporary Republican People's Party (Turkey) politicians
Living people
1963 births
People from Erfelek
Members of the 26th Parliament of Turkey
Members of the 25th Parliament of Turkey
Members of the 24th Parliament of Turkey
Members of the 23rd Parliament of Turkey
Members of the 22nd Parliament of Turkey